The Chief is a family-owned weekly newspaper in Clatskanie, Oregon, United States.

The paper was founded in 1891 by F. T. Shute. E. W. Conyers, a businessman and a former state legislator, became the controlling owner in 1889. Conyers had been a lifelong Whig, and became a Republican when that party was formed.

Arthur Steele purchased the paper in 1922, and his descendents have run it ever since. He was named president of the Oregon Newspaper Publishers Association in 1953. Arthur and his wife Melvina ran the paper until Melvina's death in 1972, when their son Gail took over. as of the early 2000s the owner was Deborah Steele Hazen. As of 2013 its circulation was about 2,400. It was founded in 1891, and in its early days it offered a bundled subscriptionn with Better Fruit, a publication in Hood River, Oregon. It is currently owned by Country Media, Inc. It publishes on Thursdays. In 2014 its title changed from The Clatskanie Chief to simply The Chief.

References

External links 
 

Newspapers published in Oregon
Clatsop County, Oregon
Columbia County, Oregon
1891 establishments in Oregon
Family-owned companies of the United States
American companies established in 1891